Aberdeen Promenade is a small urban waterfront park in Aberdeen, Hong Kong. It is located on the north shore of Aberdeen Bay across from Aberdeen Island.

See also
List of urban public parks and gardens in Hong Kong

References

Urban public parks and gardens in Hong Kong
Aberdeen, Hong Kong